Punicacortein D is an ellagitannin, a type of phenolic compound. It is found in the bark and heartwood of Punica granatum (pomegranate). The molecule contains a gallagic acid component.

References

External links 
 Knapsack Metabolite information

Pomegranate ellagitannins